Steve Barrow (born 29 September 1945) is a British reggae historian, writer and producer.

Biography
While at Honest Jon's he met Peter Dalton, with whom he later collaborated on writing The Rough Guide to Reggae. Between 1979 and 1980, he was hired freelance by Island Records to compile a series of vinyl releases: Intensified, More Intensified, Catch The Beat and The Blue Beat Years. From the 1970s and up to 1992, Barrow compiled many albums and wrote liner notes for Trojan Records in London.

In 1993, Barrow co-founded, along with Mick Hucknall, the Blood and Fire record label which specialises in reissuing older Jamaican music. Barrow's extensive knowledge of reggae was the catalyst for the creation of the Jamaican Reggae Archive Project which is funded and owned by Chris Blackwell with Barrow as de facto curator. Between 1994 and 1995, Barrow (along with Don Letts and Rick Elwood) conducted a series of interviews with Jamaican artists for the archive that aimed to preserve the history of the music. The interviews and other related material were an important factor in the writing of the book The Rough Guide to Reggae. The reggae author David Katz credits Barrow's personal recommendation to Trevor Wyatt of Island Records for his involvement in the compiling of the 1997 Lee "Scratch" Perry CD set, Arkology. In 2004, Barrow co-founded the reggae reissue label Hot Pot Music.

Bibliography
The Rough Guide to Reggae with Peter Dalton, 1997 for the first edition, Rough Guides Limited, 
The Rough Guide Reggae: 100 Essential Cds, 1999, Rough Guides Limited, 
King Jammy's, with Beth Lesser, 2002, ECW Press, UK,

References

External links
Steve Barrow interview at Niceup
Audio interview with Steve Barrow at Big Mikey Dread Reggae Radio

British music critics
Reggae journalists
Living people
1945 births
People from Forest Gate